Nsukka is a town and a Local Government Area in Enugu State, Nigeria.  Nsukka shares a common border as a town  with Edem, Opi (archaeological site), Ede-Oballa, and Obimo.

The postal code of the area is 410001 and 410002 respectively referring to University of Nigeria Campus, and Nsukka Urban.

History 

Nsukka is made up of Mkpunano, Nru, and Ihe'n Owerre. Presently, there is an erroneous trend of referring to all the towns under Enugu North Senatorial Zone as Nsukka. This trend could be as a result of Nsukka housing the headquarters of the now defunct Nsukka province under the colonial rule.

Nsukka is also a local government area and comprises several towns including Nsukka the host to the first indigenous university in Nigeria, the University of Nigeria, Nsukka (UNN).

People in Nsukka speak central Igbo and Nsukka dialect, a sub-dialect of larger Igbo language.

The influence of Nsukka people was felt as far as Idah, the Achadu Oko Attah clan in Idah historically migrated from Nsukka.

Nsukka's ancient wars

Nsukka in the 18th and 19th century had one of the best fighting forces in what is present-day Enugu-North which they employed in waging war against their neighbours in order to gain more territories for their rising population and for other purposes. Each community that made up the town of Nsukka had stationed in them a fighting force made up of people from that community.

Nsukka's numerous wars with her neighbours were usually successful such that some surrounding communities requested help from Nsukka to protect them from their attackers.

Another instance of Nsukka's expansionist bid was the war with Ejuona-Obukpa (a community in Obukpa) which eventually ended in the annexing of a part of Ejuona-Obukpa. According to D. C. Ugwu, this war should not be viewed as one between Nsukka and the entire Obukpa as Ejuona (the involved community) refused the assistance of the rest of Obukpa.

By the time the war ended, Nsukka succeeded in taking parts of Ejuona-Obukpa, almost wiping out one village (Umugboguru) of all its inhabitants in the process.

Climate

Cultural practices

Eshu (cow) funeral rituals 

Eshu is an Igbo breed of cow used in a funeral rite in the Nsukka cultural area of Igboland. Many factors influence if someone will receive funeral rites, such as how and when they die, their marital status, and if they performed the same rites for their own parents. If someone qualifies, then the rite is performed to ensure that the dead can rest peacefully and to lift them to a higher position within the spirit world. There are many animals which can be used and each animal has a different significance. The cow is the highest ranked among those used in the ritual.

Ndishi tradition 
In traditional Igbo society, men’s dominance was total. Women were to be seen but not to be heard: it was a man’s world. Whether in the day to day governance, economic activities, religion, among others, women played a peripheral role in the society. A man could marry as many wives as he wants. The younger wives could be the age mates of his first set of children. Whether the husband is virile enough to satisfy the innumerable wives is hardly taken into consideration. To check marital infidelity on the part of the women in this polygamous society, the Nsukka Igbo instituted the Ndishi/Nna tradition.  The Ndishi/Nna tradition connotes a spiritual avowal among the Nsukka people which origin is embedded in myth. The tradition forbids any married woman from engaging in any form of extra-marital affairs or assisting the relations without express permission of the husband. Women from other parts of Igboland who are married to the men of this area are usually forewarned about the efficacy of this tradition. It is the general belief among the people that any such act attracts the wrath of the gods, which results to instant madness for the transgressor. Employing qualitative approach which includes, participant observation, indepth interviews and oral tradition, the researchers explored the potency of this tradition in checking marital infidelity.  Enugu-Ezike, Obollo, and Imilike communities which have distinct cultural practices among Nsukka people were selected for the study. Johannes Andenaees’s theory of punishment and deterrence would be applied.

Masquerade 
Nsukka is known to be rich in tradition and it is one of the Igbo communities that still upholds her traditional practices especially the masquerade festival. These masquerades comes in different colors and shapes, some are beautifully made while some are tattered.  The Nsukka masquerade assumes different names in different communities. In Obollo Afor, it is called Akatakpa; in Igbo Etiti, it is known as Odo; in Orba it is known as Ogede; in Nsukka, it is called Oriokpa or Omaba. In olden days, masquerades were a rallying point as they performed different functions ranging from entertainment to peace making, social control, and it was also used for security purposes.

References

Local Government Areas in Igboland
Local Government Areas in Enugu State
Cities in Enugu State
Sacred sites in traditional African religions